WAGE-LP is a Variety formatted broadcast radio station licensed to and serving Oak Hill, West Virginia.  WAGE-LP is owned and operated by Southern Appalachian Labor School.

References

External links
 

2016 establishments in West Virginia
Variety radio stations in the United States
Radio stations established in 2016
AGE-LP
AGE-LP